Aston Villa played the  1921–22 English football season in the Football League First Division. Villa finished fifth below Burnley, and Cardiff City, just above Bolton Wanderers and Newcastle United.

Billy Walker remains the only player to have scored a hat-trick of penalty kicks in a Football League game, doing so against Bradford City in November 1921.

In the second match of the season, defender Bert Smith became the first-ever Cardiff player to score in the division with a consolation goal during a 2–1 defeat to Aston Villa.

Richard York went on to make 47 appearances in the 1921–22 campaign, as the "Villans" finished fifth in the First Division.

Football League First Division.

References

AVFC History: 1921-22

Aston Villa F.C. seasons
Aston Villa F.C. season